The Raigam Tele'es Best Teledrama Singer Award is presented annually in Sri Lanka by the Kingdom of Raigam associated with many commercial brands for the best Sri Lankan male and female Singers of the year on the television screen.

The award was first awarded in 2005. Following is a list of the winners of this prestigious title since then.

Award list in each year

References

Singer
Sri Lankan music awards